Leatherwood Creek is a stream in the U.S. state of Ohio.

Leatherwood Creek was named for the leatherwood which grew along its course.

See also
List of rivers of Ohio

References

Rivers of Champaign County, Ohio
Rivers of Miami County, Ohio
Rivers of Shelby County, Ohio
Rivers of Ohio